A single cycle processor is a processor that carries out one instruction in a single clock cycle.

See also
 Complex instruction set computer, a processor executing one instruction in multiple clock cycles
 DLX, a very similar architecture designed by John L. Hennessy (creator of MIPS) for teaching purposes
 MIPS architecture, MIPS-32  architecture
 MIPS-X, developed as a follow-on project to the MIPS architecture
 Reduced instruction set computer, a processor executing one instruction in minimal clock cycles

References

External links

Microprocessors